Roger Monteaux (1879–1974) was a French stage and film actor.

Filmography

References

Bibliography
 Goble, Alan. The Complete Index to Literary Sources in Film. Walter de Gruyter, 1999.

External links

1879 births
1974 deaths
French male film actors
French male stage actors
People from Boulogne-Billancourt